Corrinshego is a townland in the Parish of Middle Killeavy, County Armagh, Northern Ireland. It lies 1.6 km (1 mile) to the west of Newry in the Newry, Mourne and Down District Council area.

Corrinshego stretches steeply up Camlough Mountain almost to the summit, with all of the area south of the Carrivekeeney Road inside the Ring of Gullion Area of Outstanding Natural Beauty.

Sports 
The local GAA club is Thomas Davis GFC, Corrinshego.

Notable people 
John Lynch – Actor, novelist
Susan Lynch – Actress

References

External links 
Ordnance Survey Ireland
Griffith's Valuation (1847–1864) for Corrinshigo
1901 Irish Census for Corrinshigo
1911 Irish Census for Corrinshigo
OpenStreetMap
Map of Boundaries 
Ireland Genealogy Projects
ACEmap plot
1:10,000 plot
Northern Ireland Sites & Monuments Record
Historic Environment Map Viewer
Irish Townlands

Villages in County Armagh
Townlands of County Armagh